USS Perseus is a name used more than once by the U.S. Navy. Perseus is the mythological character and also the name of constellation.

 USCGC Perseus (WPC-114) was built for the U.S. Coast Guard by Bath Iron Works, Bath, Maine, and was delivered 23 April 1932.
  was laid down as Union Victory (MCV hull 683) by the Oregon Shipbuilding Corp., Portland, Oregon, 30 March 1945.

United States Navy ship names